Alphonse Decuyper (3 April 1877 – 7 June 1937) was a French male water polo player. He was a member of the Libellule de Paris water polo team. He won with the team the bronze medal at the 1900 Summer Olympics.

See also
 List of Olympic medalists in water polo (men)

References

External links
 

1877 births
1937 deaths
French male water polo players
Water polo players at the 1900 Summer Olympics
Place of birth missing
Place of death missing
Medalists at the 1900 Summer Olympics
Olympic medalists in water polo
Olympic water polo players of France
Olympic bronze medalists for France